Ryan Haggerty (born March 4, 1993) is an American professional ice hockey forward who is currently an unrestricted free agent. He most recently played  under contract with the Florida Panthers of the National Hockey League (NHL).

Playing career
Haggerty played two seasons with the USA Hockey National Team Development Program and won a gold medal with Team USA at the 2011 IIHF World U18 Championships. Before turning professional, Haggerty attended the Rensselaer Polytechnic Institute where he played three seasons (2011–14) of NCAA Division I hockey with the RPI Engineers, registering 47 goals, 37 assists, 84 points, and 102 penalty minutes in 106 games.

On March 12, 2014, the New York Rangers of the NHL signed Haggerty as an undrafted free agent to an entry-level contract.

In his first professional season in 2014–15, Haggerty was assigned to AHL affiliate, the Hartford Wolf Pack. He contributed offensively among the Wolf Pack with 15 goals and 33 points in 76 games.

On the second day of the 2015 NHL Entry Draft, Haggerty was traded by the Rangers to the Chicago Blackhawks in exchange for Antti Raanta on June 27, 2015. In the following 2015–16 season, Haggerty was assigned to the Blackhawks AHL affiliate, the Rockford IceHogs for the duration of the campaign. Limited to just 36 games with the IceHogs due to injury, Haggerty registered 13 points before ending his contract with Chicago.

As a free agent in the off-season, Haggerty opted to continue in the AHL, signing a one-year deal with the Wilkes-Barre/Scranton Penguins, an affiliate to the Pittsburgh Penguins on September 8, 2016.

After recording a personal best year with the Penguins during the 2017–18 season, with 16 goals, 21 assists and 36 points in 47 games, Haggerty re-signed for a third season with the Wilkes-Barre/Scranton on July 9, 2018. Prior to the 2018–19 NHL season, Haggerty was invited to the major league club for training camp. In two preseason games, he scored two goals and an assist. His excellent performance earned him an NHL contract; despite having already been cut from the training camp roster, Haggerty was awarded a two-year, two-way contract worth an NHL average of $675,000 per year.

During the 2019–20 season, on December 17, 2019, Haggerty was traded to the Florida Panthers in exchange for Kevin Roy.

Personal life
Haggerty's father, Roger, played four years of minor-league baseball for the Boston Red Sox organization.

Career statistics

Regular season and playoffs

International

Awards and honors

References

External links
 

1993 births
Living people
American men's ice hockey right wingers
Hartford Wolf Pack players
Ice hockey players from Connecticut
Rockford IceHogs (AHL) players
RPI Engineers men's ice hockey players
Sportspeople from Stamford, Connecticut
Springfield Thunderbirds players
USA Hockey National Team Development Program players
Wilkes-Barre/Scranton Penguins players
AHCA Division I men's ice hockey All-Americans